Komusan station is a railway station in Komusal-lodongjagu, Puryŏng, North Hamgyŏng province, North Korea. It is the junction point of the Hambuk and Musan lines of the Korean State Railway.

The station was opened in 1917 by the Chosen Government Railway, at the same time as the rest of the Ch'ŏngjin-Hoeryŏng section of the former Hamgyŏng Line; from 1934 to 1940 it was managed by the South Manchuria Railway. The station was destroyed during the Second World War; after the Korean War, it was refurbished with Soviet and Chinese assistance.

References

Railway stations in North Korea
Railway stations opened in 1917
1917 establishments in Japan